The Little Fairy is a 2006 Chinese television series based on the legend of the Fairy Couple during the Han Dynasty. The series was produced by Mediacorp (Singapore), Chinese Entertainment Shanghai (China) and Taiwanese Film Studio (Taiwan) and premiered on 16 January 2006.

Synopsis
Dong Yong, a kind and diligent man born in Eastern Han Dynasty, is a filial son and a hardworking student, whom his parents were proud of. The Seventh Fairy Maiden, uses the name Yu Xiaoqi, daughter of the Jade Emperor, comes to Earth to meet her second sister's former love, scholar Lao Xinrong. Not knowing Xiaoqi's intention, the Jade Emperor saw this as an opportunity for Xiaoqi to learn more about humans because she is very disobedient and carefree compared to the other daughters. The Jade Emperor chose the Dong family, seeing that Dong is a good person and hopes that the family can guide Xiaoqi to becoming more filial. Fortunately, Dong happens to be one of Lao's students and Xiaoqi is able to get to know more about Lao and Xiaoqi's sister's love even more. Eventually, Dong and the Maiden fall in love, which is forbidden in Heaven and repeats the tragic yet touching history of Dong's teacher, Lao and the Second Fairy Maiden. At the same time, Dong, the Seventh Fairy Maiden, and their friends are on a mission to stop another star-crossed lovers, Dong's classmate, Shangguan Haoqi and Xiang Xuehai, a civet cat deity in human form, before their quest for freedom and selfishness inadvertently triggers an apocalyptic event. After their opposites repent from their evil ways, Dong endures a series of trials to win the approval of the Maiden's family. The Jade Emperor ultimately sees Dong's worth and allows his daughter to marry the mortal, but on the condition that they will only be together for a hundred days. Months after she left, the Maiden gave birth to a baby boy in the celestial palace, and her family asks the Guanyin to entrust the Maiden's newborn son to Dong. Despite their separation, Dong Yong and the Maiden vow never to stop loving one another, even if it means to wait for thousands of lifetimes. 
 
By 2004 in Shanghai, China, Dong has been reincarnated as a contemporary young man. At a street corner, Dong Yong's present avatar meets the Maiden once more, who has once again settled in the mortal realm as a contemporary young woman, implying that she has forsaken her immortality and heavenly status. Regardless of whether he still has memories of his wife from his previous life, Dong Yong falls in love with the Maiden at first sight, suggesting that they will resume their romance.

Cast

Hu Ge as  Dong Yong  (董永)
Ariel Lin as Seventh Fairy Maiden  (七仙女)　　
TAE as Fu Yuanbao  (傅元寶)
Florence Tan as Cuiniang  (翠娘)
Bobby Dou as Shangguan Haoqi　 (上官浩淇)
Lv Yi as Li Saijin  (李賽金)
Cecilia Han as Xiang Xuehai  (香雪海)
Tse Kwan-ho as Lao Xinrong  (勞欣榮)
Phyllis Quek as Second Fairy Maiden  (二仙女)　
Elvis Tsui as Jade Emperor　　
Wu Qianqian as Queen Mother of the West 　　
Michelle Saram as Ma Nana  (馬娜娜)
Mou Fengbin as Xinba  (辛巴)
Yue Yueli as Dong Qianfa  (董千發)
Li Qinqin as Dong Wenpin  (董文聘)
Li Yoyo as Eldest Fairy Maiden  (大仙女)
Zhang Huan as Third Fairy Maiden  (三仙女)
Wan Yan as Fourth Fairy Maiden  (四仙女)
Wang Jingluan as Fifth Fairy Maiden  (五仙女)
Li Yiling as Sixth Fairy Maiden  (六仙女)
Yan Yongxuan as Shangguan Nianzu  (上官念祖)
Wang Lei as Li Meifeng  (李美鳳)
Zhao Liang as Fu Shan  (傅善)
Zhao Yi as Erlang Shen
He Sirong as Guanyin
Lu Dingyu as Earth Deity
Yang Guang as Pui Ying Academy's headmaster
Guo Qiming as Serpent Demon
Han Zhi as The Brute of Lin'an

Soundtrack

External links
 The Little Fairy on CTV website
 The Little Fairy on ATV website
 The Little Fairy on Chinese Entertainment Shanghai website
 The Little Fairy on Sina.com

2006 Chinese television series debuts
Television series set in the Eastern Han dynasty
Works based on Tian Xian Pei
Chinese romantic fantasy television series
Television about fairies and sprites
Demons in television
Ghosts in television
Television series by Tangren Media
Television shows about reincarnation
Television about magic
Shenmo television series
Television shows set in Shanghai
Mandarin-language television shows
Fiction set in 2004
Chinese mythology in popular culture